Jorge Alberto Campos Valadéz (born April 24, 1979) is a Mexican football manager and former player.

References

External links
 

1979 births
Living people
Association football midfielders
Santos Laguna footballers
Club Tijuana footballers
C.D. Veracruz footballers
Albinegros de Orizaba footballers
La Piedad footballers
Mexican football managers
Footballers from Coahuila
Mexican footballers
Sportspeople from Torreón
Liga MX players
Ascenso MX players